is a children's anime series. It aired in Japan between August 1, 2006, and January 30, 2007, on Chiba TV. The show was made as commemoration of the 15th anniversary of production company Tokyo Kids. The series follows a group of anthropomorphic animal characters who used to reside in the city suddenly transplanted to the country (Monta Island) where they attempt to adapt to life and learn important lessons.

An English dub of all 26 episodes called Going Wild, Going Green was produced by Bright Way Productions for GD Multimedia and Eternal Pictures. The dub aired in the United States on various Christian television networks Smile and on Parables TV where it was available on demand.

Characters
Monta (モン太), Monty in the English dub, was voiced by Yukiko Iwai.
Mondo (モンド), Rocko in the English dub, was voiced by Kazuya Ichijō.
Monjiro (モン次郎), Chester in the English dub, was voiced by Rikako Yamaguchi.

Episode list

International releases 
In order of debut

References

External links
Going Wild, Going Green at Smile (archive)
Patta Potta Monta at Tokyo Kids (archive)

2006 anime television series debuts
2006 Japanese television series debuts
2007 Japanese television series endings
Japanese children's animated adventure television series
Japanese children's animated comedy television series